The Michigan–Ohio State basketball rivalry is a college basketball rivalry between Michigan Wolverines men's basketball and Ohio State Buckeyes men's basketball that is part of the larger rivalry between the University of Michigan and Ohio State University that exists across a broad spectrum of endeavors including their general athletic programs: Michigan Wolverines and Ohio State Buckeyes. On the field, the athletic rivalry includes the Michigan–Ohio State football rivalry, but extends to almost all sports and many other forms of achievement. Both teams are members of the Big Ten Conference.

Series history
Ohio State currently leads the series, which began on February 17, 1909. On February 21, 2021, for the first time in the series' 185 game history dating back to 1909, the teams met while both were ranked in the Top 5. The Wolverines (15–1, 10–1 Big Ten) were ranked No. 3 in both the AP Poll and Coaches Poll while the Buckeyes (18–4, 12–4 Big Ten) were ranked No. 4 in both the AP Poll and Coaches Poll. Michigan won the game 92–87.

Rival accomplishments
The following summarizes the accomplishments of the two programs.

Due to violations from the University of Michigan basketball scandal, Michigan was forced to vacate 113 victories, including six against Ohio State, as well as four NCAA Tournament appearances, two Final Four appearances, one NIT Championship and one Big Ten tournament title. See Wikipedia:WikiProject College football/Vacated victories for further details for how vacated games are recorded.
Due to NCAA violations, Ohio State was forced to vacate 82 victories, including six against Michigan, as well as four NCAA Tournament appearances, one Final Four appearance, two Big Ten regular season championships, and one Big Ten tournament title.

Game results

References

External links

College basketball rivalries in the United States
Big Ten Conference rivalries